is a former Japanese football player.

Club statistics

References

External links

1984 births
Living people
Osaka University of Health and Sport Sciences alumni
Association football people from Ishikawa Prefecture
Japanese footballers
J2 League players
Tokushima Vortis players
Association football midfielders